Hästholmen is a locality situated in Ödeshög Municipality, Östergötland County, Sweden with 342 inhabitants in 2010.

References 

Populated places in Östergötland County
Populated places in Ödeshög Municipality